Elisabeth López Valledor (born 27 January 1975) is a Spanish team handball player who played for the club BM Sagunto and on the Spanish national team. She was born in Paris. She competed at the 2004 Summer Olympics in Athens, where the Spanish team reached the quarter finals.

References

1975 births
Living people
Spanish female handball players
Olympic handball players of Spain
Handball players at the 2004 Summer Olympics
Mediterranean Games gold medalists for Spain
Mediterranean Games medalists in handball
Competitors at the 2005 Mediterranean Games
21st-century Spanish women